Trimesic acid, also known as benzene-1,3,5-tricarboxylic acid, is an organic compound with the formula C6H3(CO2H)3. It is one of three isomers of benzenetricarboxylic acid. A colorless solid, trimesic acid has some commercial value as a precursor to some plasticizers.

Trimesic acid can be combined with para-hydroxypyridine to make a water-based gel, stable up to 95 °C.

Trimesic acid crystallizes from water in a hydrogen-bonded hydrated network with wide unidimensional empty channels.

See also
 Trimellitic acid (1,2,4-benzenetricarboxylic acid)
 Hemimellitic acid (1,2,3-benzenetricarboxylic acid)

References

Benzoic acids
Tricarboxylic acids